Kengkou Station is a station of Line 1 of the Guangzhou Metro. It started operations on 28 June 1997. It was located at the ground level of the junction of Huadi Avenue Middle  and Longxi Avenue  in Fangcun, Liwan District. It is adjacent to Fangcun Coach Station, the transportation hub for the western area of the Pearl River Delta.

Station layout

Exits

References

Railway stations in China opened in 1997
Guangzhou Metro stations in Liwan District